Hem Raj (13 November 1904 in Dera Gopipur, Kangra district – ?) was member of 1st Lok Sabha from Kangra (Lok Sabha constituency) in Punjab, India.

He was elected to 2nd, 3rd and 4th Lok Sabha from Kangra later as from Himachal Pradesh State.

References

1904 births
People from Kangra district
India MPs 1952–1957
India MPs 1957–1962
India MPs 1962–1967
India MPs 1967–1970
Himachal Pradesh politicians
Year of death missing